Anders Blomquist (born 28 April 1977) is a retired Swedish football striker.

References

1977 births
Living people
Swedish footballers
Östers IF players
FK Haugesund players
Association football forwards
Swedish expatriate footballers
Expatriate footballers in Norway
Swedish expatriate sportspeople in Norway
Allsvenskan players
Eliteserien players
Norwegian First Division players